The BWI Business District is a neighborhood and business district in Linthicum and Hanover that features over 11,000 hotel rooms and numerous office parks and shopping centers. As the name suggests, the business district is benefited by nearby BaltimoreWashington International Airport.

The district comprises two distinct areas: West Nursery to the north of Interstate 195 and Stoney Run to the south. The West Nursery District includes the original Hotel District, the Friendship Annex of the National Security Agency, the Maryland Aviation Administration, and the National Electronics Museum. The Stoney Run District includes the BWI Amtrak/MARC Rail Station, the BWI Rental Car Return Center, and the headquarters of the Maryland Department of Transportation.

History
The BWI Business District was established in 1985 along with the BWI Business Partnership. The District formalized and brought together hotels and businesses adjacent to the Baltimore-Washington International Airport, as well as federal agencies located in nearby Fort George G. Meade.

Location
Located in Anne Arundel County, Maryland, the BWI Business District is to the north and west of the airport. The West Nursery District is bordered by I-195 and the Baltimore-Washington Parkway to the west, the Patapsco River to the north, Hammonds Ferry and Camp Meade Roads to the east, and Aviation Boulevard to the south. The Stoney Run District is bordered by I-195 to the north, Aviation Boulevard to the east, Dorsey Road to the south, and the Baltimore-Washington Parkway to the west.

Businesses and organizations

Allegis Group
American Urological Association
Booz Allen Hamilton
Ciena
Coca-Cola
International Organization of Masters Mates & Pilots
Northrop Grumman
Raytheon
LSG Sky Chefs
Schmidt Baking Company
SECU
The Maritime Institute of Technology

Shopping and entertainment
The BWI Business District includes retail and entertainment establishments as well. In the West Nursery District, Airport Square Shopping Center features a Hoyts movie theater along with a number of restaurants. The BWI Technology Park also includes eateries and retail along West Nursery Road. Additional commercial centers include Arundel Mills and Maryland Live! Casino, just south of the Stoney Run District along Arundel Mills Boulevard.

Public transit
Amtrak and the MARC Train provide intercity and commuter train service to the area at the BWI Rail Station on Amtrak Way.

The Maryland Transit Administration provides Light RailLink service at the BWI Business District station on Elkridge Landing Road, along with bus service on Route 17. The BWI Trail traverses through the district as well.

External links
BWI Business Partnership https://www.bwipartner.org/about

References

Business District
Linthicum, Maryland
1985 establishments in Maryland